(Magdalena) Peñasco Mixtec, also known as Tlacotepec Mixtec, is a Mixtec language of Oaxaca spoken in the towns of Santa María Magdalena Peñasco, San Cristobal Amoltepec, San Mateo Peñasco, and San Agustín Tlacotepec. It has closer unidirectional intelligibility with other varieties, but may be closest to Ñumí Mixtec.

References 

 Magdalena Peñasco Mixtec (SIL-Mexico)

Mixtec language